Toxeus is a genus of jumping spiders first described by Carl Ludwig Koch in 1846. The genus was synonymized with Myrmarachne by Eugène Simon in 1901, and remained a synonym until revived by Jerzy Prószyński in 2016, when he split up Myrmarachne.

Prószyński placed Toxeus in his informal group "myrmarachnines". When synonymized with Myrmarachne, it was placed in the tribe Myrmarachnini, part of the Salticoida clade of the subfamily Salticinae in Maddison's 2015 classification of the family Salticidae.

Species
, it includes the following species:
Toxeus alboclavus Jose & Sudhikumar, 2022 – India
Toxeus bicuspidatus (Yamasaki, 2012) – Sulawesi
Toxeus cuneatus (Badcock, 1918) – Malaysia
Toxeus globosus (Wanless, 1978) – Angola to China
Toxeus grossus (Edmunds & Prószyński, 2003) – Malaysia
Toxeus hirsutipalpi (Edmunds & Prószyński, 2003) – Malaysia, Singapore, Bali
Toxeus jajpurensis (Prószyński, 1992) – India
Toxeus latithoracicus (Yamasaki & Hung, 2012) – Ryukyu Islands
Toxeus magnus (Saito, 1933) – Taiwan
Toxeus maxillosus C. L. Koch, 1846 – Southeast Asia to Philippines, Sulawesi, Lombok
Toxeus septemdentatus (Strand, 1907) – China
Toxeus yamasakii Logunov, 2021 – Vietnam

References

Salticidae
Salticidae genera